Huanbei is a station on the Taoyuan Airport MRT located in Zhongli, Taoyuan City, Taiwan. It opened for commercial service on 2 March 2017 and currently serves as the western terminus of the line.

Overview
This underground station has one island platform with two tracks. Only Commuter trains stop at this station. It opened for trial service on 2 February 2017, and for commercial service 2 March 2017. It is a planned transfer station with the Taoyuan Metro Orange Line (O09).

Construction on the station began on 12 December 2007, and opened for commercial service on 2 March 2017 with the opening of the Taipei-Huanbei section of the Airport MRT.

Around the Station

 Laojie River (160m southwest of the station)

 SOGO Zhongli Store (850m southeast of the station)
 Zhongli Tourist Night Market (1.1km southwest of the station)

Exits
Exit 1: Section 1, Zhongfeng North Road

See also
 Taoyuan Metro

References

Railway stations opened in 2017
2017 establishments in Taiwan
Taoyuan Airport MRT stations